The archaeological site of -Mitrou is located on a tidal islet in the Gulf of Atalanti, in East Lokris in Central Greece. Excavation of the site is conducted under the direction of the American School of Classical Studies, and as of 2007 is ongoing.

Finds from surface survey indicate human presence already in the Neolithic period; occupation continues throughout the Bronze Age and into the Early Iron Age. In addition to the settlement, a Bronze Age boat and burials dating to the Bronze and Early Iron Ages have been found close to the settlement. Part of the site's importance derives from the apparently continuous habitation here after the end of the Mycenaean palatial Bronze Age, with no gap apparent between the post-palatial Bronze Age and the Early Iron Age. This situation is mirrored in other Central Greek sites, such as Lefkandi, Kalapodi, Elateia, and Pyrgos Livanaton/Kynos.

References

Mycenaean sites in Central Greece
Neolithic sites in Greece
Archaeological sites in Central Greece
Former populated places in Greece
Ancient Greek archaeological sites in Greece